Underwater work is work done underwater, generally by divers during diving operations, but includes work done underwater by remotely operated vehicles and crewed submersibles.

Skills commonly used by all professional diving occupations

Underwater navigation

Pilotage involves navigation by naturally observable landmarks and phenomena, such as sunlight, water movement, bottom composition (for example, sand ripples run parallel to the direction of the wave front, which tends to run parallel to the shore), bottom contour and noise.  Although natural navigation is taught on courses, developing the skills is generally more a matter of experience.
Compass navigation is a matter of training, practice and familiarity with the use of underwater compasses, combined with various techniques for reckoning distance underwater, including kick cycles (one complete upward and downward sweep of a kick), time, and occasionally by actual measurement, which may involve the length of umbilical deployed. Kick cycles depend on the diver's finning technique and equipment, but are generally more reliable than time, which is critically dependent on speed. Techniques for direct measurement also vary, from the use of calibrated distance lines or surveyor's tape measures, to a mechanism like an impeller log, to pacing off the distance along the bottom with the arms.
Use of a guide line or jackstay. A guide line may be laid to facilitate navigation to and from the underwater workplace. This allows divers to travel to and from the workplace with minimal delay, even in poor visibility. A jackstay serves the same purpose in heavy duty format.

Underwater searches

Underwater searches are procedures to find a known or suspected target object or objects in a specified search area under water. They may be carried out underwater by divers, crewed submersibles, remotely operated underwater vehicles, or autonomous underwater vehicles, or from the surface by other agents, including surface vessels, aircraft and cadaver dogs.

A search method attempts to provide full coverage of the search area. This is greatly influenced by the width of the sweep which largely depends on the method used to detect the target. For divers in conditions of zero visibility this is as far as the diver can feel with his hands while proceeding along the pattern. When visibility is better, it depends on the distance at which the target can be seen from the pattern, or detected by sonar or magnetic field anomalies. In all cases the search pattern should completely cover the search area without excessive redundancy or missed areas. Overlap is needed to compensate for inaccuracy and sensor error, and may be necessary to avoid gaps in some patterns.

Diver searches:
Circular search
Pendulum search
Jackstay searches
Snag-line search
Compass searches
Spiral box search
Compass grid search
Ladder search
Swim-line search
Directed search
Towed search
Searches using hand held submersible sonar transponders
Current drift search
Depth contour search     
Searches by submersibles, remotely operated vehicles and autonomous underwater vehicles
Searches by surface vessels
Searches by aircraft
Searches from the shore

Rigging and lifting
Basic ropework, knots and splices, tackle
Rigging slings cargo nets and spreaders, lifting hooks and shackles
Lifting bags
Chain blocks, tirfors and pullers

Inspection, measuring and recording

Use of basic hand tools
Hacksaws
Hammers
Cold chisels
Pliers
levers, wedges and crowbars
Screwdrivers and wrenches
Pipecutters and bolt cutters

Underwater inspection 
Inspection of underwater structures, installations, and sites is a common diving activity, applicable to planning, installation, and maintenance phases, but the required skills are often specific to the application. Much use is made of video and still photographic evidence, and live video to allow direction of the inspection work by the supervisor and topside specialists. Inspections may also involve surface preparation, often by cleaning, and non-destructive testing. Tactile inspection may be appropriate where visibility is poor.

Skills specific to specialist occupations

Erecting formwork (shuttering) (civils)
Underwater concrete placement using a tremie or skip (civils)
Oxy-arc cutting (salvage, ships husbandry, offshore)
Underwater welding (salvage, ships husbandry, offshore)
Use of pneumatic and hydraulic power tools (ships husbandry, civils, offshore, salvage}
High pressure jetting (ships husbandry, civils, offshore)
Hydraulic bolt-tensioning (offshore oil and gas)
Fitting and maintenance of wellhead components (offshore oil and gas)
Hull cleaning and inspection (ships husbandry)
Mooring inspection and maintenance (ships husbandry, offshore)
Pipeline inspection (offshore oil and gas)
Propeller polishing (ships husbandry)
Inspection and replacement of cathodic protection anodes (ships husbandry, offshore)
Explosive demolition (clearance, civils)
Bomb disposal (military, public safety)
Archaeological excavation (archaeology)
Search and recovery (public safety)
Forensic evidence collection and preservation (police)
Search and rescue (public safety, police)
Site surveys and mapping (scientific, archaeology)
Biological sampling and tagging (scientific)
Core drilling (scientific)
Setting up and recovery of instrumentation (scientific)
Transect surveys (scientific)

Gallery

References